Angraecum atlanticum is a species of comet orchid that can be found in Equatorial Guinea and Gabon. It is known from three subpopulations; in Monte Alén National Park in Equatorial Guinea and in Moukalaba-Doudou National Park and Ivindo National Park in Gabon. It is found in epiphyte-rich submontane forest, and in the shrubby fringes rich in Burseraceae.

References

atlanticum
Orchids of Africa
Orchids of Gabon
Flora of Equatorial Guinea
Near threatened plants